Tolidewal was a VDC in Bajura District. Now this VDC is the part of Triveni Municipality of Sudurpashchim Province. At the time of 1991 Nepal census it had a population of 2,991 and had 599 houses in the village.
Triveni Municipality office is also located here.

History
Tolidewal was a VDC in Bajura District. Now this VDC is the part of Triveni Municipality. Previously it had 9 wards which are now merged into ward no 3, 4 and 5 of Triveni Municipality.

Education

Higher Secondary School
Tolidewaldada Secondary School

Secondary school
Rameshwori Secondary School

Lower Secondary School
Bhageswori Secondary School
Dhaulpuri Secondary School

Primary school
Janajyoti Primary School
Triveni Primary School
Masteshwori Primary School

References

Populated places in Bajura District
Village development committees (Nepal)